"I Think I Like It" is the second single by British electronic musician Fake Blood and the first single from his EP Fix Your Accent.

Composition
"I Think I Like It" samples the song "In the Heat of a Disco Night" by Arabesque and features lead vocals by Heike Rimbeau.

Chart performance
"I Think I Like It" became Fake Blood's second single to chart on the Dutch Singles Chart. It peaked at No. 47 and spent a total of 9 weeks on the chart. It did not out peak his previous single "Mars", which had also peaked at No. 40. Despite this, "I Think I Like It" spent more weeks on the chart than "Mars", which had spent a total of 4 weeks on the Dutch Singles Chart. It debuted at No. 95 on the UK Singles Chart.

Music video
Jo Apps directed the music video for "I Think I Like It". It is presented in a television shopping channel-style with two saleswomen advertising various mundane and/or useless products. The video ends with one of the women being given a 'makeover', only to find she now looks hideous. She fights with her co-saleswoman as the screen continues to show advertisements, before cutting to a technical difficulties image.

In popular culture 
 The song was used in the 2015 American film We Are Your Friends, starring Zac Efron.

Track listing
Digital download
 "I Think I Like It (Radio Edit)" – 2:48
 "I Think I Like It" – 5:35

Charts

Weekly charts

Year-end charts

References

2009 songs
2009 singles
Fake Blood songs
PIAS Recordings singles